33 FC is a Hungarian football club from the town of Óbuda, Budapest.

History
33 FC debuted in the 1902 season of the Hungarian League and finished third.

From 1926 to 1929, while they were named Budai 33, legendary Hungarian footballer Pál Titkos played for the club. It was his first senior team.

Name Changes
 1900–1926: 33 FC
 1926–1929: Budai 33
 1929–1949: Budai 11
 1949–1957: Ganzvillany
 1957–1958: Dohánygyár

References

External links
 Profil
 Profil
 Official website

Football clubs in Hungary
1900 establishments in Hungary